The Zelten oil field (now known as the Nasser field) is located at the foot of the Zelten Mountains, about   south of Brega in Concession 6. Zelten holds the title as the largest oil field in the Gulf of Sidra. The 229 wells in Zelten use a gas lifting system. The Zelten oil field is not associated with the town Zelten, which is located in the North-West of Libya.

Background
Esso Standard began production of Zelten in 1961. The Zelten gas-lift system was installed during the period from 1969 to 1971 and represented one of the first uses of gas lift on a fieldwide basis to produce the high volume wells typical of Middle East Oil fields.

Sirte Oil Company
The Sirte Oil Company (SOC), a subsidiary of the National Oil Corporation, was originally created in 1981 to take over Exxon's holdings in Libya. In 1986, SOC took over the assets of Grace Petroleum, one of the five US companies forced by the US government to leave Libya in 1996. SOC operates the Raguba field in the central part of the Sirte Basin. The field is connected by pipeline to the main line between the Zelten field and Brega. Besides Zelten, SOC is in charge of two other gas fields (Attahadi and Assumud) plus the Brega liquefied natural gas (LNG) plant.

Sirte-Zelten Petroleum System

There is one dominant petroleum system in the Sirte Basin sourced by the Cretaceous Sirte Shale. In the Central Sirte Basin, carbonates of Upper Cretaceous, Paleocene and Eocene age produce in 150 fields on significant horst blocks or platforms (e.g., the Beda and Zelten platforms). Reservoirs are largely carbonate build-ups and reefs with some offshore production in the Gulf of Sidra. Carbonate reservoirs are largely related to two Upper Cretaceous and two Paleocene cycles of sedimentation in a syn-rift fill sequence; however, there is minor Mid-Cretaceous calcarenite production. Giant oil fields in this unit include Intistar, Beda, Defa, Waha, Haram, Zelten (Nasser), Hofra and Nafoora.

Upper Cretaceous Sirte Shale of the Rakb Group is the dominant source rock. Geochemical data of 81 oils demonstrate that the Sirte Shale generates a low sulfur, high gravity oil with low gas oil ratios. Generation began in Eocene era and continues to present. Onshore the petroleum is dominantly oil; however, offshore increased thermal gradients and deeper burial suggest higher gas oil ratios and natural gas potential. The Upper Cretaceous carbonate reservoirs are commonly dolomites whereas the lower Paleocene cycles include calcilutites, calcarenites, oolites and skeletal debris. The petroleum system is named after the Zelten Formation, which was deposited in this latter Paleocene transgression.

See also 

 List of oil fields

Notes

References
Baird, D.W., Geohistory and petroleum in the central Sirt Basin, in The geology of Sirt Basin: p. 3-56.
Baric, G., Geochemical characterization of source rocks in NC-157 Block (Zaltan Platform), Sirt Basin, (Ibid), p. 541-553.

Oil fields of Libya
Tripolitania
Horsts (geology)